Maharaja's College is a station of Kochi Metro. It was opened on 3 October 2017 as a part of the extension of the metro system from Palarivattom to Maharaja's College. The station remained the western terminus of the line until 3 September 2019, when the line was extended to Thaikoodam. The previous station is M. G. Road. The name of the station refers to Maharaja's College.

References

Kochi Metro stations
Railway stations in India opened in 2017